The 7th Artistic Gymnastics World Championships were held in Ljubljana, Kingdom of Serbs, Croats and Slovenes (now Slovenia) on August 11–12, 1922.

Medal table

Team All-round

Individual all-round

Pommel horse

Rings

Parallel bars

Horizontal bar

References

Sources 
 Prvi ljubljanski stadion 

World Artistic Gymnastics Championships
World Artistic Gymnastics Championships, 1922
Sport in Ljubljana
International gymnastics competitions hosted by Yugoslavia
1922 in Yugoslav sport